Grotte may refer to:

Grotte, Sicily, a comune in the province of Agrigento, Italy
Grotte di Castro, a comune  in the Province of Viterbo in the Italian region Latium
Robert Grotte, a New Zealand professional rugby league footballer
 Nicolas de La Grotte, a French composer and keyboard player of the Renaissance

See also

 
 Grotto (French: Grotte), a natural or artificial cave 
 Grottasöngr, an Old Norse poem
 Grotta (disambiguation)